Russula illota is an inedible species of mushroom in the genus Russula. It is commonly found in deciduous and coniferous forests on chalk.

Description
The cap is spherical when young, later broadly convex and can be flat when old. It is dull ochre and covered in a grey slime, up to 15 cm in diameter. The gills are pale cream and close together, giving off a scent of bitter almonds when rubbed. The spores are also pale cream. The stem is white and becomes blotchy with age.

Similar species
Russula laurocerasi is not yet technically distinguished from this species.

See also
List of Russula species

References
E. Garnweidner. Mushrooms and Toadstools of Britain and Europe. Collins. 1994.

External links

illota
Fungi of Europe